

March railway station is on the Ely–Peterborough line in the east of England and serves the town of March, Cambridgeshire.

The station, which was opened in 1847, was once a major junction with a number of lines radiating from the town.
The station has been the scene of a number of accidents including a double train crash in 1896.
 
The station has since reduced in importance, with several lines being dismantled or mothballed.

The station originally had seven platforms. However, two of these are now filled-in bay platforms and the track has been removed from a further west-facing bay on the southern side of the station. There are now just two operational platforms, although track has been re-laid on two disused platforms on the northern side of the station and it is anticipated that these may be used should proposals to re-open the line to Wisbech come to fruition. The nearby Whitemoor marshalling yard returned to use in 2004 having been disused since the early 1990s.

In 2021, a Victorian ledger dating back to April 1885 was found after it fell from the loft of the station when contractors were removing rotten wood work. The ledger is planned to go on display at the station.

In March 2022, the station car park was resurfaced and repainted.

Spalding, St Ives and Wisbech branches 
The Spalding line was closed by British Rail in November 1982 and was completely lifted a few years later. The St Ives branch was closed completely in March 1967 as a result of the Beeching cuts, whilst the Wisbech line (known as the Bramley Line) closed to all traffic in 2000 having lost its regular passenger services (through to ) in September 1968. The trackwork however remains intact and there are proposals to reopen the line as a heritage line run and maintained by enthusiasts.

Services 

CrossCountry operates an hourly service eastbound to Cambridge and Stansted Airport as well as westbound services towards Peterborough,  and Birmingham.

References

External links 

 Friends Of March Railway Station

  

Railway stations in Cambridgeshire
DfT Category E stations
Former Great Eastern Railway stations
Railway stations in Great Britain opened in 1847
Railway stations served by East Midlands Railway
Railway stations served by CrossCountry
Greater Anglia franchise railway stations
1847 establishments in England
March, Cambridgeshire